Elizabeth Hernández (born 1993) is a Mexican-born American visual artist and designer. She works many mediums including in painting, murals, ceramics, and embossed aluminum sculpture. She lives in Oakland, California.

Biography 
Her husband and sometimes artistic collaborator is artist Ryan Whelan. In 2023, she and Whelan exhibited at "A Weed By Any Other Name" at the newly opened Institute of Contemporary Art San Francisco (ICA SF) in the Dogpatch.  

Her work is part of the museum collections at the San Francisco Museum of Modern Art, and the Fine Arts Museums of San Francisco.

Exhibitions 
 2015 – "Tortillería Horizontal", site specific group project, Mexico City, Mexico
 2020 – "Talisman: Liz Hernández", Pt. 2 Gallery, Oakland, California
 2021 – "Californisme Partie 2", Bim Bam Gallery, Paris, France
 2022 – "Tikkun: For the Cosmos, the Community, and Ourselves", Contemporary Jewish Museum, San Francisco, California
 2022 – "Bay Area Walls", San Francisco Museum of Modern Art (SFMoMA), San Francisco, California
 2023 – "A Weed By Any Other Name", Institute of Contemporary Art San Francisco (ICA SF), San Francisco, California
 2023 – "Shifting the Silence", San Francisco Museum of Modern Art (SFMoMA), San Francisco, California

See also 
 Chicana art

References

External links 
 Podcast: Episode 54: Liz Hernández (2021), from The (art)Scene

1993 births
Artists from Mexico City
Mexican emigrants to the United States
Artists from Oakland, California
21st-century Mexican artists
21st-century Mexican women artists
Living people